Mickey Kydes (born July 25, 1964 in Norwalk, Connecticut) is a retired American soccer midfielder who played professionally in the Major Indoor Soccer League, USISL and Major League Soccer.  He also spent three seasons in Greece and several in the semi-professional Cosmopolitan Soccer League.

Youth
Kydes played soccer at Norwalk High School from 1978 to 1981.  He then attended Long Island University where he was a 1983 and 1985 third team All-American.  He finished his career with 34 goals and 35 assists.  He graduated with a bachelor's degree in marketing in 1986.  Long Island University inducted Kydes into its Hall of Fame in 2005.

Professional
On June 7, 1986, the Dallas Sidekicks selected Kydes in the Major Indoor Soccer League draft.  He played twenty-nine games with the Sidekicks as the team won the MISL championship before being released on July 2, 1987.  That summer, he played for the U.S. soccer team at the 1987 Pan American Games.  In 1988, he moved to Greece where he spent the three season playing for Aris Thessaloniki F.C. of the Greek Alpha Ethniki, as well as Beta Ethniki clubs Kallithea F.C. and Eordaikos.  In 1990, he returned to the United States.  He played 1991 and 1992 with Greek American AA in the Cosmopolitan Soccer League.  In 1993, he was with the Connecticut Wolves in the USISL.  He returned to the CSL in 1994, this time with the New York Pancyprian-Freedoms.  He returned to the USISL in 1995 with the New York Fever.  On February 7, 1996, the New York/New Jersey MetroStars selected Kydes in the 11th round (109th) overall in the 1996 MLS Inaugural Player Draft.  He played eleven games for the MetroStars during the first half of the season, then retired on June 16, 1996.  In 1997, he returned to play two games for the Long Island Rough Riders of the USISL.

He currently owns Mickey Kydes Soccer Enterprises, which provides professional coaching support and planning services to youth soccer clubs, and operates Mickey Kydes Soccer Camps  and is president of Beachside Soccer Club of CT a premier soccer program for elite youth players. He coaches the u17s. Kydes started Beachside, which is non-profit, in 1994 and it has grown into one of the more successful clubs of its kind in the Northeastern U.S.

In 2008, Connecticut Soccer Hall of Fame inducted Kydes.

References

External links
Dallas Sidekicks Player Profile

1982 births
Living people
American expatriate soccer players
American expatriate sportspeople in Greece
Aris Thessaloniki F.C. players
Greek American AA players
Kallithea F.C. players
Connecticut Wolves players
Dallas Sidekicks (original MISL) players
LIU Sharks men's soccer players
Long Island Rough Riders players
New York Pancyprian-Freedoms players
Major Indoor Soccer League (1978–1992) players
Major League Soccer players
New York Red Bulls players
New York Fever players
USISL players
Cosmopolitan Soccer League players
Soccer players from Connecticut
American soccer players
Association football midfielders
Expatriate footballers in Greece
Norwalk High School (Connecticut) alumni
Sportspeople from Norwalk, Connecticut